Frans W. H. Muller (born 1961) is a Dutch businessman, and the CEO of Ahold Delhaize, since July 2018, having been deputy CEO.

Education 
Muller earned a master's degree in business economics from Erasmus University Rotterdam.

Career
Muller started his career with KLM Cargo, from 1988 to 1997. He worked for Makro Cash & Carry from 1998 to 2002. He worked for Metro AG from 2002 to 2013, rising to become a Member of the Management Board of Metro Group AG and CEO Metro Cash & Carry.

In 2013, Muller joined Delhaize as president and CEO. Muller was CEO of Delhaize until Ahold bought the company for Euro 9.3 billion in 2015, when he became deputy CEO of the combined company.

Muller succeeded Dick Boer when he retired as CEO of Ahold Delhaize on 1 July 2018.

References

Living people
Ahold Delhaize people
Dutch businesspeople
Dutch chief executives in the retail industry
Erasmus University Rotterdam alumni
1960s births